In the 1970s and 1980s, Indian Navy's deployments outside the Indian Ocean were largely limited to delivery of new vessels. Over years, the Indian leadership looked at the Navy as an effective tool for foreign policy and this was reflected in the pattern of Indian navy deployments.  The Indian Navy hosted its first International Fleet Review in February 2001. This event was termed "Bridges of Friendship" and was attended by 24 warships form 19 countries. An office dedicated to international co-operation was created in 2005. This term has been used by the Navy since then to undertake humanitarian and security missions by engaging with nations primarily in the Indian Ocean littoral region and South-east Asia. These engagements include mutual port visits, international forums and joint naval exercises.

In late 2017, the Indian Navy adopted a new plan for deployment of warships which was aimed to counter the increasing presence of Chinese presence in the Indian Ocean. Under the new plan, 14–15 mission ready warships are deployed across multiple regions including the Malacca Strait and Andaman Sea; North Andaman Sea and Bay of Bengal (Bangladesh and Myanmar), Lakshadweep islands and Maldives; Madagascar; the Persian Gulf and the Arabian Sea.

Summary of naval deployments 

The following is a list of naval deployments, CORPAT's and naval exercises of the Indian Navy.

References

Deployments
Naval Deployments